Brian Allgeier (born March 10, 1971) is an American video game designer who is best known for being the original designer and creative director of the Ratchet & Clank series developed by Insomniac Games for the PS2, PS3, PS4 and PS5.

He started working in videogames in 1991 as an artist and animator on the CD-i title, Hanna Barbera’s Cartoon Carnival for Philips Media. He worked as part of the internal production group, *FunHouse*, led by game designer Cliff Johnson.

In 1999, he joined Insomniac Games as a level designer on the Spyro the Dragon series for the PlayStation and later became design director on the Ratchet & Clank series for the PlayStation 2. In 2006, he became creative director on Ratchet & Clank Future: Tools of Destruction, which was the first PlayStation 3 installment for the Ratchet & Clank series, as well as the first installment for the Future series.

Games

References

1971 births
Living people
American video game designers
People from Dayton, Ohio